

Terrestrial channels

Since 2012, all channels are digital.

All national, regional and local Spanish television channels are available to Portuguese households along the national border, subject to restrictions due to distance or local topography. Regional Spanish channels (like TV Galicia or Extremadura TV) usually acknowledge this and cover local events of the border communities on their programs.

Subscription-based channels
All terrestrial channels are available in these platforms and services. Most of the subscription-based channels broadcast from Portugal or have a specific version with independent programs for that market. Most of these channels are widely available across platforms and services: Basic cable and fiber, digital services in cable, fiber, landlines and satellite across the nation.

International Portuguese channels
International services of the main Portuguese networks, which are unavailable in Portugal. In addition to these, most of the Portuguese subscription-based channels are also available internationally, mostly in Africa.

International thematic channels

International channels including thematic channels in foreign languages, subtitled in Portuguese. Most of these channels are available in digital cable and satellite services.

International channels
International channels in foreign languages: News and national promotion, thematic channels and those targeted at minority communities in Portugal. Most of these channels are available in digital cable services only, thematic channels may also be available in satellite.

See also
 Television in Portugal
 Media of Portugal

 
Mass media in Portugal
Portugal
Stations